Húnaflói ("Huna Bay") is a large bay between Strandir and Skagaströnd in Iceland. The towns Blönduós and Skagaströnd are located on the bay's eastern side.

Fauna
The bay has been proposed as a protected area for harbor seals.

References

Fjords of Iceland